Eva María Navarro García (born 27 January 2001) is a Spanish professional footballer who plays as a forward for Primera División club Atlético Madrid and the Spain women's national team.

Club career

Early years
Navarro began playing futsal with local club Hispania Yecla before moving to play club football for Pinoso in nearby Alicante. In 2015, Navarro signed with Sporting Plaza de Argel, debuting in the Segunda División. While with the club, Navarro helped reach the promotion play-offs in 2016–17 and 2017–18.

Levante UD
On 26 June 2018, Navarro signed for Primera División club Levante UD. On 9 September 2018, she made her debut for the club as a 61st minute substitute in the season opener, a 1–0 win over Rayo Vallecano. On 22 December 2018, she scored her first goal for Levante in a 4–2 defeat to Logroño.

Her contract expired in June 2020. However, Navarro was one of 17 players in a class action lawsuit against the Association of Women's Football Clubs (ACFF) and the Association of Spanish Football Players (AFE) disputing the use of the Compensation List that would unrealistically inflate the fee necessary for other Primera División to sign allocated players as free agents. Navarro's compensation was set at €500,000, pricing any Spanish club out of signing her as a free agent. While teammate Ona Batlle opted to move abroad for free in July, Navarro wanted to remain in Spain. In August 2020, she elected to sign a one-year extension at Levante. In March 2021, Navarro underwent surgery on a season-ending cruciate ligament injury in her left knee. Having returned as a 68th-minute substitute on 31 October 2021 in a league game against Sporting de Huelva, Navarro made seven appearances before tearing the same cruciate ligament in a match on 19 December 2021. She did not return during the season and, on 9 June 2022, announced she was leaving following the expiration of her contract.

Atlético Madrid
On 7 July 2022, Navarro signed a one-year contract with Atlético Madrid.

International career

Youth
Navarro has represented Spain at under-17, under-19 and under-20 level including at six major youth tournaments: three UEFA Women's Under-17 Championship editions (2016, 2017 and 2018), two FIFA U-17 Women's World Cup editions (2016 and 2018), the 2019 UEFA Women's Under-19 Championship and the 2018 FIFA U-20 Women's World Cup.

On 21 May 2018, Navarro scored both goals in a 2–0 win over Germany in the 2018 UEFA Women's Under-17 Championship final. She finished as the second highest scorer with 6 goals and was named to the team of the tournament. In August, Navarro was called up to the 2018 FIFA U-20 Women's World Cup squad as a 17-year-old, playing in all six games as Spain lost in the final to Japan. In December 2018, Navarro returned to the under-17 side to compete at her third major tournament of the year, traveling to Uruguay for the 2018 FIFA U-17 Women's World Cup. Navarro scored two goals during the group stage on the way to helping Spain win the tournament, beating Mexico 2–1 in the final.

Senior
On 17 May 2019, Navarro made her senior debut in a 4–0 friendly victory over Cameroon, appearing as a 74th minute substitute for Esther González. She scored her first senior goal on 27 November 2020 in a 10–0 UEFA Women's Euro 2022 qualifying victory over Moldova.

Career statistics

Club
.

International summary
Statistics accurate as of match played 23 February 2021.

International goals
 As of match played 18 February 2021. Spain score listed first, score column indicates score after each Navarro goal.

Honours

International
UEFA Women's Under-17 Championship: 2018
FIFA U-17 Women's World Cup: 2018
FIFA U-20 Women's World Cup runner-up: 2018

Individual
2018 UEFA Women's Under-17 Championship team of the tournament

References

External links

2001 births
Living people
People from Yecla
Footballers from the Region of Murcia
Spanish women's footballers
Women's association football forwards
Atlético Madrid Femenino players
Levante UD Femenino players
Sporting Plaza de Argel players
Primera División (women) players
Spain women's international footballers
Spanish women's futsal players
Spain women's youth international footballers
21st-century Spanish women